This article details the Toronto Wolfpack's rugby league football club's 2018 season. This is the Wolfpack's 2nd season in their history and 1st season in the Championship after the Wolfpack dominated the 2017 League 1 season and earned promotion to 2018 Rugby League Championship.

Season review

September 2017 

After winning the 2017 League 1 season and promotion to the Championship, Toronto immediately sought to improve their squad as they announced that centre Tom Armstrong had signed from Super League side Widnes Vikings. Warrington Wolves prop forward Ashton Sims signed for the Wolfpack on a 2-year deal. Albanian prop Olsi Krasniqi was the next to sign from Salford Red Devils along with Australian prop David Taylor from Canberra Raiders and NRL halfback Josh McCrone from St George Illawarra Dragons.

October 2017 

October started with Toronto paying £130,000 for the services of loose forward Joe Westerman from Warrington Wolves on a three-year deal. Following this, the Wolfpack acquired hooker Andy Ackers from Championship side London Broncos on a two-year deal. During this month it was revealed that the club would be releasing props Steve Crossley, Tom Dempsey and Shaun Pick whilst halfback Rhys Jacks and hooker Sean Penkywicz would also be released.

November 2017 

The fixtures for the 2018 season were released and it was revealed that Toronto would travel to relegated Leigh Centurions for the first game of the season, the Wolfpack will play their first 11 games away from home before they host Halifax RLFC on April 28. Toronto would also face Leigh during the annual Summer Bash as the headline match. Club captain, Craig Hall, becomes another departing Wolfpack player, leaving on personal terms for family reasons. The Wolfpack also announced a ground breaking Transatlantic Challenge which would see them face the Bradford Bulls in a pre-season match in 2018 and 2019, with the 2018 fixture being played at Odsal Stadium on 26 January and the 2019 fixture likely to be played in Canada or the United States to promote the sport. Furthermore, Toronto agreed to change their UK base from Brighouse Rangers to Manchester Metropolitan University in order to take advantage of better facilities.

December 2017 

December started with the announcement that the Wolfpack would kick off the Magic Weekend in 2018 by playing against Toulouse Olympique in order to promote the international teams within the sport and also promote the RFL Championship to a wider audience. It was also revealed that Toronto had signed forward Cory Paterson on a two-year deal from relegated Leigh Centurions. Furthermore, the Wolfpack also signed forward Sam Hopkins and winger Adam Higson on a one-year deals from Leigh.

January 2018 

It was revealed that prop forward Dan Fleming wanted to remain close to home due to the birth of his first child and approached coach Paul Rowley to be released, this was granted and he signed a 2 year deal with Championship side Halifax RLFC. Toronto announced that prop forwards Fuifui Moimoi, David Taylor and Ryan Bailey left the club by mutual agreement whilst on a pre-season camp to Portugal. The Wolfpack revealed that newcomer Josh McCrone would captain the side for the 2018 season whilst ex Warrington Wolves prop Ashton Sims would be the club's vice captain. During a press conference for League 1 side Bradford Bulls it was announced that the Wolfpack had entered a dual registration deal with the Bulls. The Wolfpack signed young centre Nick Rawsthorne from Hull F.C. on a 2 year deal and also prop forward Jack Buchanan from Widnes Vikings on a one year deal. In their only pre-season friendly, the Wolfpack comfortably beat Bradford 34–0 with Liam Kay scoring two tries and Quentin Laulu-Togaga'e, Cory Paterson, Blake Wallace and Joe Westerman also scoring tries. Ryan Brierley took over the kicking duties and kicked five from six attempts.

February 2018 

Life in the Championship started well for the Wolfpack as they beat fellow promotions contenders Leigh Centurions 34–12. Former Leigh player Liam Kay scored a hat trick whilst Ryan Brierley, Cory Paterson and Adam Sidlow also scored tries with Brierley rounding things off with five conversions. Following the opening day victory Toronto announced the signing of Australian centre Jake Butler-Fleming from League 1 side York City Knights. A tough trip to Barrow Raiders saw the Wolfpack grind out a hard fought 8–8 draw in bad conditions, second row Andrew Dixon and centre Nick Rawsthorne both scored tries. Following this Toronto beat Championship stalwarts Halifax R.L.F.C. 20–8, superstar prop Ashton Sims made his debut in this match. Winger Adam Higson scored his first two tries for the club with Greg Worthington and Rawsthorne also crossing the line for a try each whilst Brierley kicked two goals. Toronto bolstered their pack by signing retired player Reni Maitua on a two year deal. Round 4 found Wolfpack with a 47–16 loss to top of the league London Broncos which gave the Wolfpack their biggest loss so far, Dixon and Richard Whiting scoring tries whilst Liam Kay continued his try scoring form with a try. Brierley converted two goals.

March 2018 

March found Wolfpack at the top of the Championship thanks to the wins over Easter against Featherstone Rovers 24–16. Game against Swinton Lions was their highest scored so far 52–12. Wolfpack strengthen their squad by signing Salford Red Devil's Fullback Gareth O'Brien
and NRL's Canterbury Bulldogs Centre Chase Stanley

. Impact of the signing was evident during the game against Batley Bulldogs 26–18 where O'Brien scored his first hat-trick for Wolfpack. Stanley made his first try for the team week later against Dewsbury Rams 23–12.

April 2018 

Despite being plagued with injuries, Easter Monday win against Toulouse Olympique 24–22 followed by two more with Batley Bulldogs 26–18, Dewsbury Rams 23–12 continued Wolfpack dominance at the top of the table. NRL's Manly Sea Eagles Darcy Lussick signing 3 year contract was a much needed addition to the Wolfpack. As Lamport stadium undergoes renovations, first home game was played in London against Halifax RLFC and won by Wolfpack 42-10.

May 2018 

Prior their first home game of the season Wolfpack has signed Scottish international and Warrington Wolves Full-back Matty Russell. With Lamport Stadium under maintenance, Canadian opener was played at Fletcher's Fields. Game against Swinton Lions was a decisive win for the Toronto Wolfpack 62–14. Clash with Super League's Warrington Wolves ended up in defeat 66-10 thus ending Wolfpack run for Challenge Cup 2018, while game against Toulouse Olimpique at Dacia Magic Weekend found team winning 43–30 with debut try for Matty Russell and 7th hat-trick for the Wolfpack by Liam Kay. With 25 points they continued to lead Championship Table. Last away game was played during Summer Bash 2018 with Toronto Wolfpack winning 28–26 against Leigh Centurions.

June 2018 

Month of June found Wolfpack undefeated on their home grounds. Game against London Broncos, the only team Wolfpack lost to in the beginning of the season was a sound 32-12 victory. Gareth O'Brien started as a kicker against Dewsbury Rams and continued through the month with games against Barrow Raiders and Leigh Centurions, rivalry between Wolfpack and the former continues as Wolfpack won all three clashes.

July 2018 
After the game against Sheffield Eagles (a 68–4 win), Toronto Wolfpack secured the Betfred Championship League Leaders Shield 2018. The Wolfpack had their first home defeat during the regular season against Featherstone Rovers (12–30).

Competitions

Pre-season friendlies

Challenge Cup

Championship

Table

Results

Super 8s

Million Pound Game

Squad statistics 
Statistics include Championship, Challenge Cup and Super 8s matches, as of 9 October 2018.

Transfers

In

Out

Milestones 

Round 1: Josh McCrone, Jack Buchanan, Joe Westerman, Andy Ackers, Adam Higson, Nick Rawsthorne, Cory Paterson and Sam Hopkins made their debut for the Wolfpack.
Round 1: Liam Kay scored his 4th hat-trick for the Wolfpack.
Round 1: Cory Paterson scored his 1st try for the Wolfpack.
Round 1: Ryan Brierley kicked his 1st goal for the Wolfpack.
Round 2: Olsi Krasniqi made his debut for the Wolfpack.
Round 3: Ashton Sims made his debut for the Wolfpack.
Round 3: Adam Higson scored his 1st try for the Wolfpack.
Round 5: Jake Butler-Fleming and Reni Maitua made their debut for the Wolfpack.
Round 5: Jake Butler-Fleming scored his 1st try for the Wolfpack.
Round 6: Ryan Brierley reached 100 points for the Wolfpack.
CCR4: Liam Kay scored his 5th hat-trick for the Wolfpack.
Round 7: Gareth O'Brien made his debut for the Wolfpack.
Round 7: Reni Maitua and Josh McCrone scored their 1st try for the Wolfpack.
Round 8: Chase Stanley made his debut for the Wolfpack.
Round 10: Gareth O'Brien scored his 1st try for the Wolfpack.
Round 10: Gareth O'Brien scored his 1st hat-trick for the Wolfpack.
Round 11: Chase Stanley scored his 1st try for the Wolfpack.
Round 11: Ryan Brierley kicked his 1st drop goal for the Wolfpack.
CCR5: Darcy Lussick made his debut for the Wolfpack.
Round 12: Darcy Lussick scored his 1st try for the Wolfpack.
Round 13: Olsi Krasniqi scored his 1st try for the Wolfpack.
Round 13: Liam Kay scored his 6th hat-trick for the Wolfpack.
Round 13: Ryan Brierley reached 200 points for the Wolfpack.
Round 14: Matty Russell made his debut for the Wolfpack.
Round 14: Sam Hopkins and Matty Russell scored their 1st try for the Wolfpack.
Round 14: Liam Kay scored his 7th hat-trick for the Wolfpack.
Round 17: Jack Buchanan scored his 1st try for the Wolfpack.
Round 17: Gareth O'Brien kicked his 1st goal for the Wolfpack.
Round 18: Liam Kay scored his 50th try and reached 200 points for the Wolfpack.
Round 18: Blake Wallace scored his 25th try and reached 100 points for the Wolfpack.
Round 19: Blake Wallace scored his 3rd hat-trick for the Wolfpack.
Round 21: Blake Wallace scored his 4th hat-trick for the Wolfpack.
Round 21: Ryan Brierley scored his 25th try for the Wolfpack.
Round 23: Ashton Sims scored his 1st try for the Wolfpack.
Qualifier 2: Mason Caton-Brown made his debut for the Wolfpack.
Qualifier 2: Adam Sidlow made his 50th appearance for the Wolfpack.
Qualifier 3: Mason Caton-Brown scored his 1st try for the Wolfpack.
Qualifier 5: Gareth O'Brien kicked his 1st drop goal for the Wolfpack.

Notes

References

External links 
 Toronto Wolfpack

2018 in rugby league by club
2018 in Canadian rugby league
Toronto Wolfpack seasons